was a women's football team. The club was founded in 1978, and disbanded in 1997.

Honors

Domestic competitions
Empress's Cup All-Japan Women's Football Tournament
Champions (1) : 1989
Runners-up (5) : 1979, 1983, 1984, 1985, 1988

Results

Women's football clubs in Japan
Association football clubs established in 1979
1991 establishments in Japan